The Bocksten Man is the remains of a medieval man's body found in a bog in Varberg Municipality, Sweden. It is one of the best-preserved finds in Europe from that era and is exhibited at the Varberg County Museum. The man had been killed and impaled to the bottom of a lake which later became a bog. In 2006, he was reconstructed to show what he may have looked like when he was alive, and it was displayed in the Halland Museum of Cultural History, alongside the original skeleton.

The discovery
In the 1880s a farm called "Bocksten" was established near a bog. The bog was then regularly drained, and a harrow used to gather peat. The farm owner Albert Johansson had previously found a leather shoe in the wetland and gave it to the Varberg County Museum. A shoe sole was found in the bog in summer of 1934. The body was found by Albert Johansson's son Thure G. Johansson while gathering peat on 22June 1936. His harrow apparently caught on sackcloth. On examination Johansson saw parts of a skeleton. The next day, Johansson and his father contacted the local police and a doctor. On investigation, they realized it was too old to be of criminal interest.

Johan Albert Sandklef (1893–1990), director of Varberg County Museum, took charge, inviting others — among them  naturalist and geologist Lennart von Post (1884–1951), professor at Stockholm University. The group visited on 24June. They measured and photographed the find before excavating it. The upper parts of the man had passed through the harrow and were badly damaged while the lower parts were intact.

The Swedish Museum of National Antiquities was consulted after the midsummer weekend to assist with conservation. Curator Gillis Olson and textile expert, historian and archaeologist Agnes Teresa Geijer (1898–1989) took part in the conservation and evaluation. They came to Varberg on 9July, assisting Sandkelf in the documentation and giving conservation advice. The Bocksten Man has been part of the museum's exhibition since 1937.

Description
Of the inner organs, parts of the lungs, liver and brain as well as cartilage are preserved. The man had been impaled to the lake bed with two poles; one of oak that hit his heart and one of beech which went through his back.

The tunic is among the best-preserved medieval tunics in Europe, and made of woollen fabric. On his upper body he wore a shirt and a cloak, while his legs were covered by hosiery. Apart from the clothing he had a fabric bag, foot coverings, leather shoes, a belt, a leather sheath and two knives. On the inner layer a similar pattern was carved, though this time a pole was added to the symbol.

Interpretations
Several people have evaluated the finding, among them museum director Johan Albert Sandklef, Gunnel Margareta Nockert  of Uppsala University and  historian Owe Wennerholm. All three have written books regarding their findings.

Date
The find is generally dated to the 14th century. The dating is based on the clothing, especially the type of hood he wore. Albert Sandklef specified the date of the find to the 1360s, while Margareta Nockert suggests the 1330s. Owe Wennerholm argues that the hood he wore was used over a much larger time frame and only limits the date of the find to between 1250 and 1520. He does however put forward the hypothesis that the man might be Simon Gudmundi, a 15th-century priest, known to have died in 1491.

A piece of the cloth was radiocarbon dated in the late 1980s. It gave as result a 68 percent likelihood of a date between 1290 and 1410 and a 95 percent likelihood of a date between 1290 and 1430. Some uncertainties do however arise as the conservation process might have affected the result. The fact that the find came from a bog is also of concern, as bog finds are known to be hard to date.

Age
Based on the teeth, Gunnar Johansson  forensic odontologist and department head of the Faculty of Odontology at Karolinska Institute, has concluded that the man was between 25 and 35 years old when he died. Based on the skeleton, Osteologist Nils-Gustaf Gevall (1911–1991) of Stockholm University, come up with an age of between 35 and 40 years, though the man might have been up to 60 years old.

Social group
Depending on the interpretation of the clothing, and in particular the hood, different conclusions can be made about the man's social background.
The hood he wore was usually worn by the more prosperous classes of medieval society and it has therefore been suggested that he may have been either a tax collector or a soldier recruiter. The type of hood was also used within the Roman Catholic Church. Based on this and a symbol on a shield-shaped pendant, it has been suggested by Owe Wennerholm that the man belonged to the religious order  Ordine di Santo Spirito.

Local legend
Some days after the find was revealed a local farmer (Karl Andersson) told Albert Sandklef of a legend he had heard as a child. Two old people from Åkulla had told his father about a man who was recruiting soldiers in the area. He had been killed by the peasants and buried in a bog. He would start haunting late at night, and in order to stop this, poles were struck through his body, whereafter the haunting stopped. The farmer and Albert Sandklef went to Nackhälle and questioned several older people in the area. However, nobody recognized the legend.

Cause of death
It has been a matter of some discussion what actually caused the death of the man. In January 2006 a professor and a doctor at Sahlgrenska University Hospital performed an "operation" on a plastic model of the body, based on computed tomography of the body. As a result, they concluded that he had first been hit at the lower jaw, then at the right ear and finally a lethal hit further towards the back of his head.

Identity
A hypothesis has been presented that the person was Simon Gudmundi, the dean of the Diocese of Linköping who died on 12 May 1491.
In his 1998 book, Vem var Bockstensmannen? (Who was the Bocksten Man?), Owe Wennerholm reasoned that Gudmundi's name fit with what might be initials found on what might be a micro shield. It is also likely that Gudmundi visited the area. He worked with a group which tried to get Catherine of Vadstena canonized. One of her reputed miracles had taken place in the neighboring village. Speculation was that he was killed by order of Hemming Gadh (c. 1450–1520) so that Gadh could assume the post of dean of the Diocese of Linköping.

Location
The bog in which the man was found is close to the border between Himle and Faurås hundreds. It is also close to the border between Rolfstorp, Sibbarp, Köinge and Svartrå parishes. The hundreds were responsible for the handling of murders, which meant that in this case there might be some confusion over the correct hundred to handle the case, to the advantage of the killer(s). It has therefore been assumed that the killer(s) had good local knowledge.

References

External links

 Bockstensmannen at Hallands kulturhistoriska museum (Swedish)
 Swedish bog man murdered - 700 years ago. The Local. 24 January 2006.

Sources
 
 
 

1936 archaeological discoveries
1936 in Sweden
14th-century Swedish people
Archaeological discoveries in Sweden
Bog bodies
Deaths by beating in Europe
June 1936 events